Synechodontiformes is an extinct order of prehistoric sharks, known from the Permian to the Paleogene. They are considered to be members of Neoselachii, the group that contains modern sharks and rays. Their placement in the group is uncertain, some authors have considered them to be galeomorph crown-group sharks, while others have considered them to represent a stem-group to modern sharks. They have sometimes been considered a paraphyletic grouping, but Klug (2010) recovered the group as monophyletic. Members of the clade are united by two synapomorphies, "pseudopolyaulacorhize tooth root pattern present; labial root depression in basal view present". The oldest possible member of the clade are teeth from the early Permian (Cisuralian) of the Ural Mountains.

Taxonomy 
Primarily after Klug (2010)

 †Orthacodontidae de Beaumont, 1960
 †Sphenodus Agassiz, 1843 Early Jurassic - Paleocene
†Occitanodus Guinot, Cappetta & Adnet, 2014, France, Early Cretaceous (Valanginian)
 †Pseudonotidanidae Underwood & Ward, 2004a
 †Welcommia Cappetta, 1990
 †Pseudonotidanus Underwood & Ward, 2004a
 †Palaeospinacidae Regan, 1906
 †Antrigoulia Guinot, Cappetta, & Adnet, 2014 France, Early Cretaceous (Valanginian)
†Synechodus Woodward, 1888 Rhaetian-Paleocene
 †Palidiplospinax Klug & Kriwet, 2008
†Paraorthacodontidae Klug, 2010
†Paraorthacodus Glikman, 1957,
†Macrourogaleus Fowler, 1947
 Incertae sedis
 †Rhomphaiodon Duffin, 1993a
 †Mucrovenator Cuny et al., 2001
†Safrodus Koot & Cuny, 2014 Early Triassic, Oman
†Polyfaciodus Koot & Cuny, 2014 Early Triassic, Oman

References

External links 
 
 

 
Prehistoric cartilaginous fish orders
Permian first appearances
Lopingian taxonomic orders
Early Triassic taxonomic orders
Middle Triassic taxonomic orders
Late Triassic taxonomic orders
Early Jurassic taxonomic orders
Middle Jurassic taxonomic orders
Late Jurassic taxonomic orders
Early Cretaceous taxonomic orders
Late Cretaceous taxonomic orders
Paleocene taxonomic orders
Paleogene extinctions